The Middle American screech owl (Megascops guatemalae), also known as the Guatemalan screech owl, is a species of owl in the family Strigidae. It is found from northern Mexico to northern Nicaragua.

Taxonomy and systematics

The taxonomy of the Middle American screech owl is somewhat unsettled. The International Ornithological Committee (IOC) recognizes these five subspecies but notes that fuscus and dacrysistactus might not be distinct enough to warrant subspecies status.

M. g. hastatus Ridgway (1887)
M. g. cassini Ridgway (1878)
M. g. fuscus Moore & Peters (1939)
M. g. guatemalae Sharpe (1875)
M. g. dacrysistactus Moore & Peters (1939)

The North American Classification Committee of the American Ornithological Society (AOS/NACC)) and the Clements taxonomy add two others, M. g. thompsoni and M. g. vermiculatus. The IOC includes M. g. thompsoni within the nominate M. g. guatemalae and treats M. g. vermiculatus as a separate species, vermiculated screech owl (M. vermiculatus).

Description

It is dimorphic, with one morph overall grayish-brown and the other overall rufous. Unlike other owls of the same genus, it has feathered feet. The brown morph has a light brown facial disc with a thin dark border, thin white brows over yellow eyes, and short dark "ear" tufts. Its crown and upperparts range from dark gray brown to blackish brown; the crown has blackish spots and bars and the back has darker streaks and vermiculations. The fairly long tail is barred. The underparts are paler with conspicuous longitudinal stripes and some horizontal stripes. The beak is greenish. The rufous morph is overall reddish and the various streaks and stripes are less distinct. The various subspecies are similar, differing mainly in size (which increases north to south) and the intensity of the colors.

Distribution and habitat

The five subspecies of Middle American screech owl recognized by the IOC are found thus:

M. g. hastatus, western Mexico from Sonora and Chihuahua south to Sinaloa and Oaxaca
M. g. cassini, eastern Mexico from Tamaulipas south to northern Veracruz
M. g. fuscus, central Veracruz
M. g. guatemalae, from southeastern Veracruz and northeastern Oaxaca (including the Yucatán Peninsula and Cozumel Island) south through Belize and Guatemala into Honduras
M. g. dacrysistactus, northern Nicaragua

The Yucatán and Cozumel populations are treated as M. g. thompsoni by the AOS/NACC and Clements. 

The Middle American screech owl inhabits several types of humid to semi-arid landscapes including evergreen, semi-deciduous, and thorn forest, and to a lesser extent secondary forest and plantations.

Behavior

Feeding

The Middle American screech owl is nocturnal; it hunts mostly by swooping on prey from a perch and also by catching it in flight. Its diet is mostly large insects but sometimes includes small vertebrates.

Breeding

Little is known about the Middle American screech owl's breeding phenology. It apparently nests mostly in March and April but may extend that into Jun. The clutch of two or three eggs is laid in a natural tree cavity or abandoned woodpecker hole.

Vocalization

The Middle American screech owl's principal territorial song is "a rapid, quavering trill...increasing in pitch and volume, [and] ending abruptly". Its secondary song is a "short series of notes...in bouncing-ball rhythm."

Status

The IUCN has assessed the Middle American screech owl as being of Least Concern. However, its population is unknown and potentially faces threat from habitat loss.

References

Further reading
 König, C., F. Weick & J.H. Becking (2008) Owls of the World. Christopher Helm, London, 

Middle American screech owl
Birds of Central America
Birds of Belize
Birds of Honduras
Middle American screech owl
Middle American screech owl
Taxonomy articles created by Polbot